In combinatorial mathematics, block walking is a method useful in thinking about sums of combinations graphically as "walks" on Pascal's triangle. As the name suggests, block walking problems involve counting the number of ways an individual can walk from one corner A of a city block to another corner B of another city block given restrictions on the number of blocks the person may walk, the directions the person may travel, the distance from A to B, et cetera.

An example block walking problem

Solution by brute force
A "brute force" solution to this problem may be obtained by systematically counting the number of ways Fred can reach each point  where

 and 

without backtracking (i.e. only traveling North or East from one point to another) until a pattern is observed. Actually, you could receive the number of ways to get to a particular point by adding up the number of ways you can get to the point south of it and the number of ways you can get to the point west of it.(With the starting point being zero and all the points directly north and south of it one.) In general, one soon discovers that the number of paths from A to any such X corresponds to an entry of Pascal's Triangle.

Combinatorial solution
Since the problem involves counting a finite, discrete number of paths between lattice points, it is reasonable to assume a combinatorial solution exists to the problem. Given the coordinates of B, regardless of the path Fred travels he must walk along the vectors E and N exactly  and  times, respectively. As such, the problem reduces to finding the number of distinct rearrangements of the word
,
Thus the total number of paths Fred could take from A to B traveling only  blocks is

Other problems with known block walking combinatorial proofs
 Proving that
 
 can be done with a straightforward application of block walking.

See also
Lattice path

References

Combinatorics